The 1994 Women's World Snooker Championship was a women's snooker tournament played in the United Kingdom and India in 1994 and was that year's edition of the Women's World Snooker Championship first held in 1976. The early rounds were played at the Cue Sports Snooker Club in Raunds, Northamptonshire and the quarter-finals onwards were played at the Meridien Hotel, New Delhi. Defending champion Allison Fisher beat Stacey Hillyard 7–3 in the final to take the title, her seventh and last Women's World Snooker Championship win.

Tournament summary

Early rounds
The initial rounds of the tournament, up to the fourth round (last 16) were held at the Cue Sports Snooker Club in Raunds, Northamptonshire. Of the top eight seeds, Allison Fisher, Karen Corr, Stacey Hillyard, Tessa Davidson and Kim Shaw qualified for the quarter-finals, whilst Ann-Marie Farren, Mandy Fisher and Lynette Horsburgh failed to get through. In the last 16 round, Farren was beaten 2–4 by Kelly Fisher after leading 2–0, Mandy Fisher lost 1–4 to Sarah Smith, and Horsburgh was defeated 1–4 by Sharon Dickson. Hillyard compiled the highest break of the competition, 108, in her third-round match against Gaye Jones. Defending champion Allison Fisher won 4–0 against both Valerie Dalgliesh and Julie Gillespie.

Quarter-finals
From the quarter-finals onwards, matches were held at the Meridien Hotel, New Delhi, the first time that the championship was held outside of the United Kingdom. The quarter-finals onwards were televised by Indian national television, and on Sky in the United Kingdom.

Hillyard also had a 5–0 win, making four breaks over 30 in defeating Shaw. Davidson was 1–3 down to Kelly Fisher but then leveled at 3–3 and went ahead at 4–3. After Fisher won the eighth frame, Davidson took the decider with the aid of a 44 break. Corr was 1–3 down to Dickson before winning four frames in a row to win 5–3.

Semi-finals
Allison Fisher took a 3–1 lead against Davidson, then lost two of the next three to make it 4–3. Although Fisher won the next two frames and the match, she described it as "one of the toughest matches I've ever been involved in." Hillyard reached her sixth world championship final with a 6–3 win over Corr.

Final
In the first session, Fisher won the opening frame, but was then 2–1 and 3–2 behind. She drew level at 3–3 with a break of 102 in the sixth frame.

The match featured breaks over 30 in nine of the ten frames was seen as closer than the end result suggested It was the seventh and last time that Fisher won the title.

Prize money
Source: Snooker Scene
Winner (Allison Fisher): £7,500
Runner-up (Stacey Hillyard): £2,500
Losing semi-finalists: £1,000
Losing quarter-finalists: £500
Fourth round losers: £250
Third round losers: £100
Second Round losers: £75
First Round losers: £50
Highest Break (Stacey Hillyard, 108): £400

Main draw
Source: Snooker Scene

Final
Source: Snooker Scene

References

World Women's Snooker Championship
1994 in snooker